The 1999–2000 Georgian Cup (also known as the David Kipiani Cup) was the fifty-sixth season overall and tenth since independence of the Georgian annual football tournament.

Preliminary round 

|}
Source:

Round of 32 

|}
Source:

Round of 16 

|}
Source:

Quarter-finals 
The matches were played on 15 March (first legs) and 22 March 2000 (second legs).

|}
Source:

Semi-finals 
The matches were played on 2 May (first legs) and 9 May 2000 (second legs).

|}
Source:

Final

See also 
 1999–2000 Umaglesi Liga

References

External links 
 The Rec.Sport.Soccer Statistics Foundation.
 es.geofootball.com 

Georgian Cup seasons
Cup
Georgian Cup, 1999-2000